Eochuangia is an extinct genus from a well-known class of fossil marine arthropods, the trilobites. It lived during the Cambrian Period, which lasted from approximately 541 to 488 million years ago.

References

Leiostegiina
Corynexochida genera
Cambrian trilobites
Cambrian animals of Asia